Frederick George Pierpoint (24 April 1915 – 23 July 1997) was an English first-class cricketer active 1936–46 who played for Surrey. He was born in Camberwell; died in Telford.

References

1915 births
1997 deaths
English cricketers
Surrey cricketers
Norfolk cricketers